KGEO (1230 AM, "ESPN Bakersfield") is a radio station broadcasting a sports format. Licensed to Bakersfield, California, United States. It is the flagship station of American General Media, it serves inland central California.  The station's studios are located at Easton Business Complex in southwest Bakersfield, and its transmitter is located southwest of Highway 58 and Union Avenue in southeast Bakersfield.

The station was assigned the KGEO call letters by the Federal Communications Commission on May 18, 1981.

KWAC (AM) operates from KGEO's transmitter site and uses its tower.

History
The station signed on in 1945 as KERO.   At that time, it broadcast from the El Tejon hotel in Downtown Bakersfield.  In 1953, it spawned Bakersfield's second television station, which still bears the KERO-TV calls.

Original local owner Kern County Broadcasters sold off the radio station in 1955, and the call letters were changed to KGEE.  It supported a  mix of talk and popular music.  Its moniker was "KGEE, the talk of the town". In 1981, it changed the call letters to KGEO, and became one of Bakersfield's first stations to program an "oldies" format, consisting of music from 1954 to current. The station was known as "KGEOldies". During the 1980s, it advertised itself as playing 4 decades of hits. It switched to an all talk format in the late 1990s.  At that point KGEO experimented with "hot talk" carrying such syndicated programs as the "Phil Hendrie Show" and "the Tom Leykis Show".  Until 2006, KGEO was an all-sports station and carried an extensive lineup from ESPN Radio.  KGEO is no longer the flagship station for the Bakersfield Blaze of the California League of Minor League Baseball and the Bakersfield Condors in the ECHL.  Imus in the Morning was heard on KGEO until its cancellation in April 2007, as was its replacement shows throughout the summer of 2007.  KGEO also dropped "The Don and Mike" show just one week before radio legend Don Geronimo had planned to retire anyway.  On Monday, March 31, 2008, KGEO affiliated with ESPN Radio and was rebranded as ESPN Radio 1230.  On April 5, 2011, KGEO changed formats and became a news/talk station known as "$mart Talk 1230."

Programming 
Programming heard on KGEO previously included the syndicated shows of Dennis Miller, Dave Ramsey, Lou Dobbs, Clark Howard, Wall Street Journal Radio, America's Morning News, and Red Eye Radio.  Local programing heard on KGEO includes Your Radio Store and also Californian Radio with host Jeff Lemucchi and he's joined by hosts  Richard Beene, Lois Henry, Robert Price and John Arthur. KGEO also broadcasts minor league baseball games of the Bakersfield Blaze of the California League.

Previous logo

References

External links

Your Radio Store - a show carried on Smart Talk 1230

Sports radio stations in the United States
GEO
Radio stations established in 1945
1945 establishments in California
ESPN Radio stations